Youngstown is a former passenger railroad station in Youngstown, Ohio. The station is on the ex Baltimore and Ohio Railroad, and was a B&O passenger station for most of the twentieth century. The station was built in 1905 and operated as a passenger station until 1971, when the B&O yielded passenger train service to Amtrak. It was later a passenger station for Amtrak through the 1990s and early 2000s.

History

The station was built in 1905 at the cost of $70,000. It was located on the southern banks of the Mahoning River. This was in contrast to competing stations of the Erie, New York Central and Pennsylvania railroads located in the city's downtown. The B&O raised the railroad tracks to the level of the building's second floor after river flooding of the area, which reached an epic level in March 1913. In 1926 the company added a freight house.

Passenger trains
The B&O's famed Capitol Limited ran through the city, but it did not stop there until later years. Noted passenger trains at 1956 included:

Ambassador - Detroit - Baltimore
Cleveland Night Express - Cleveland - Baltimore
Washingtonian - Cleveland - Baltimore
Columbian - Chicago - Washington, D.C.
Shenandoah - Chicago - Jersey City

Declining years
The B&O terminated several trains running through Youngstown over the course of the 1960s. By 1964, the B&O had eliminated the trains to Cleveland. Detroit-bound travelers would need to transfer at Deshler for the Cincinnatian or the Night Express to Detroit.

The B&O in 1964 changed the Capitol Limited to the Capitol. The renamed train began stopping at intermediate stations such as Youngstown. By 1965, only this station and the Erie station on West Commerce Street remained as passenger stations in Youngstown.

In the station's final years the station was serving the Capitol Limited (name restored) and an unnamed day train from Akron to Washington. In 1971 Amtrak took over passenger train operations from the Baltimore & Ohio and this marked the end of passenger trains at the Youngstown station. All remaining rail traffic was strictly freight oriented.

Legacy
In the mid-1980s the city bought the station building, amidst anticipation that the building would be demolished. In 1991 a restaurant took over the location.

The station briefly had a renaissance in the 1990s and early 2000s. From 1990 to 1995 the station served Amtrak's Broadway Limited (Chicago-New York) on a brief rerouting of the train. And from 1997 to 2005 the station served Amtrak's Three Rivers (Chicago-New York).

Gallery

References

Former Baltimore and Ohio Railroad stations
Railway stations in the United States opened in 1905
Railway stations closed in 1971
Former railway stations in Ohio
Former Amtrak stations in Ohio
Railway stations in the United States opened in 1990
Railway stations in the United States opened in 1997
Railway stations closed in 1995
Railway stations closed in 2005
National Register of Historic Places in Mahoning County, Ohio